Clonmel is the county town and largest settlement of County Tipperary, Ireland. The town is noted in Irish history for its resistance to the Cromwellian army which sacked the towns of Drogheda and Wexford. With the exception of the townland of Suir Island, most of the borough is situated in the civil parish of "St Mary's" which is part of the ancient barony of Iffa and Offa East.

Population
The 2016 Census used a new boundary created by the Central Statistics Office (CSO) to define the town of Clonmel and Environs resulting in a population figure of 17,140.

Etymology

The name Clonmel is derived from the anglicisation of the Irish name Cluain Meala meaning "honey meadow" or "honey valley." It is not clearly known when it got this name; many suppose that it came from the fertility of the soil and the richness of the country in which it is situated.

History

Town walls

Clonmel grew significantly in medieval times, and many reminders of this period can be found in the town. A small section of the town walls remains in place near Old St. Mary's Church. This building is one of the main architectural features of the town. It was originally built in the 14th century or earlier but has been reconstructed or renovated on numerous occasions. The church was fortified early in its history, the town being strategically important, initially for the Earls of Ormonde, and later the Earl of Kildare. Some fortified parts of the church were destroyed or damaged during the Cromwellian occupation. One of the former entry points into the town is now the site of the 'West Gate, a 19th-century reconstruction of an older structure. There were originally three gates in the walled town, North, East and West – with the South being protected by the river Suir and the Comeragh Mountains. The West Gate is now an open arched entrance onto O'Connell Street, the main street of the town.

Corporation regalia
Under a charter granted by James I of England, Clonmel became a Free Borough on 5 July 1608, and the Mayor and officers of the town were granted the power to "name, elect and constitute one Swordbearer and three Sergeants-at-Mace". The present sword and two silver maces date only from Cromwellian times. The sword, of Toledo manufacture, was donated by Sir Thomas Stanley in 1656 and displays the Arms and motto of the town. The larger mace is stamped 1663.

Cromwellian period

Oliver Cromwell laid siege to Clonmel in May 1650. The walls were eventually breached, but Hugh Dubh O'Neill, the commander of the town's garrison, inflicted heavy losses on the New Model Army when they tried to storm the breach. That night, O'Neill, deciding that further resistance was hopeless due to a lack of ammunition, led his soldiers and camp followers out of the town under cover of darkness. The story is told that Cromwell became suspicious of O'Neill's desperate situation when a silver bullet was discharged by the townspeople at his troops outside the walls. The following morning, 18 May 1650, mayor John White was able to surrender the town on good terms as Cromwell was still unaware of the garrison's escape just hours before. Although feeling deceived, Cromwell did not put the inhabitants 'to the sword' as occurred elsewhere.

After being denounced by three men who desired the £5 bounty and arrested at Fethard while vested for Mass on Holy Saturday, 25 March, 1654, Augustinian Friar William Tirry was taken to Clonmel Gaol (on the future site of the Clonmel Borstal) and held there pending trial. On 26 April, he was tried by a jury and Commonwealth judges, including Colonel Solomon Richards, for violating the Proclamation of 6 January 1653, which defined it as high treason for priests to remain in Ireland. In his own defense, Fr. Tirry replied that while he viewed the Commonwealth as the lawful Government, he had no choice but to disobey its laws, as the Pope had ordered him to remain in Ireland. Fr. Tirry was according found guilty and sentenced to death by hanging, which was carried out in Clonmel on 2 May 1654.

An account told by Franciscan Friar Matthew Fogarty, who had been tried with Friar William Tirry, supplies further details: "William, wearing his Augustinian habit, was led to the gallows praying the rosary. He blessed the crowd which had gathered, pardoned his betrayers and affirmed his faith. It was a moving moment for Catholics and Protestants alike."

Despite the efforts of a Puritan minister to silence him, Fr. Tirry told the assembled crowd, "there is only one true Church, whose head is the pope: Pope and Church are to be obeyed. He publicly forgave the three men who had betrayed him, and... stated explicitly that he had been offered life and favour, it would renounce his religion." Fr. Tirry was then hanged, after which he was buried, with some ceremony, in the ruins of the Augustinian friary in nearby Fethard. The evidence is that he was buried in the grounds, rather than inside the ruins of the church, but it has not yet been possible to locate his grave. Fr. William Tirry was beatified by Pope John Paul II along with 16 other Irish Catholic Martyrs on 27 September 1993. The Augustinian order celebrates his feast day on 12 May.

18th century
During the second half of the 18th century, the famous Sean nos song Príosún Chluain Meala was composed inside Clonmel Gaol by one O'Donnell, a member of the Whiteboys originally from Iveragh, County Kerry, who was being held awaiting execution by hanging upon the following Friday. According to Donal O'Sullivan, O'Donnell had two companions awaiting the rope with him and that their heads were posthumously severed from the their bodies and displayed spiked upon the prison gates. "The Gaol of Cluain Meala", a highly popular and often sung English translation of the lyrics, was made by County Cork poet Jeremiah Joseph Callanan (1795–1829).

19th century
A permanent military presence was established in the town with the completion of Kickham Barracks in 1805.

Following the failed attempt at rebellion near Ballingarry in 1848, the captured leaders of the Young Irelanders were brought to Clonmel for trial. The event was followed with great interest internationally and for its duration brought journalists from around the country and Britain to Clonmel Courthouse. Standing in the dock in the image opposite is Thomas Francis Meagher, Terence MacManus and Patrick O'Donoghue. Their co-defendant, William Smith O'Brien was also sentenced to be hanged, drawn and quartered, the last occasions such a sentence was handed down in Ireland. When delivering the guilty verdict, the foreman of the Grand Jury, R.M. Southcote Mansergh, great-grandfather of the academic Nicholas Mansergh stated:
We earnestly recommend the prisoner to the merciful consideration of the Government, being unanimously of opinion that for many reasons his life should be spared.
The sentences of O'Brien and other members of the Irish Confederation were eventually commuted to transportation for life to Van Diemen's Land. A conspiracy to rescue the prisoners on 8 November led by John O'Leary and Philip Gray was betrayed and resulted in the arrest at 'The Wilderness' of seventeen armed rebels led by Gray.

20th century
Clonmel was the location of the foundation of the Labour Party in 1912 by James Connolly, James Larkin and William O'Brien as the political wing of the Irish Trades Union Congress.

21st century
In November 2015 the town was the location of Ireland's first marriage between two men.

Administration and politics 
The Clonmel was one of ten boroughs retained by the Municipal Corporations (Ireland) Act 1840. The borough corporation elected 12 councillors. The first mayor of Clonmel Borough in 1843 was John Hackett.

Under the Local Government (Ireland) Act 1898, the area became an urban district, while its body retained the style of a borough corporation. The borough corporation became a borough council in 2002. On 1 June 2014, the borough council was dissolved and administration of the town was amalgamated into Tipperary County Council. Pat English was the last Mayor of Clonmel Borough Council.

Clonmel retains the right to be described as a borough. The chair of the borough district uses the title of mayor, rather than Cathaoirleach.

As of the 2019 Tipperary County Council election, the local electoral area of Clonmel elects 6 councillors.

National
Clonmel belongs to the Dáil constituency of Tipperary which elects five TDs to Dáil Éireann (the Irish Parliament).

Senator Garret Ahearn is a former mayor of Clonmel borough district. He was a candidate in Tipperary at the 2020 Irish general election.

Geography
The town is built in the valley of the River Suir. It divides the town which is mainly located on the north bank. To the south, the town is surrounded by the Comeragh Mountains and Slievenamon to the northeast. To the north, east and west is some of Ireland's richest farmland, known as the Golden Vale. The town covers a land area of approximately 11.59 km2.

Climate

Flood defences
The River Suir floods the local area after very heavy rainfalls in the up-river catchment area of 2,173 km2. The Office of Public Works (OPW) completed and installed a Flood Forecasting System which has been used since 2007. The flood of 2015 had a flow of 390m3/s, 2004 had a flow of 354m3/s with the flood of 2000 having a flow of 353m3/s. The 2015 flood was the worst since that of 1946, which had seen a flow of 479m3/s. Phase 1 of the Clonmel Flood Defence (planned to cope with a 100-year flood) started in 2007. It was scheduled to be completed by late 2009. Phases two and three were completed by 2012. Property omitted from Phase 1 along the Convent Road were protected in 2014 and the access to the river for the workmen's boat club was also raised. 
Flooding of October 2014 was less than a 1–5 flood with a flow of 300m3/s. As part of a media exercise by the OPW the barriers were all put up.

The flood defence consists of demountable barriers, walls and earth banks. Flooding occurred at the Gashouse Bridge, Coleville Road, Davis Road, the Quays and the Old Bridge area before the flood defences. Clonmel is not tidal as the tide turns above the Miloko chocolate crumb factory in Carrick-on-Suir. Floodwaters spill onto the land above Miloko on the County Waterford side of the river.

Economy

Retail
Clonmel's main shopping streets are Gladstone Street and O'Connell Street which are home to many national and international retailers such as Elverys Sports, Penneys, River Island, Easons and Lifestyle Sports to name a few. More local retailers can be found along the streets branching off from those streets.

The Showgrounds Shopping Centre built during the Celtic Tiger can be found only 1 km from the town centre. This modern shopping centre built on the towns original showground, houses retailers such as M&S, TKMaxx, Argos and Golden Discs.

The Poppyfield Retail Park is located on the outskirts of the town. It has many stores such as DID Electrical, Supervalue, Maxi Zoo, Woodie's and World of Wonder. The retail park has food vendors being KFC, Costa Coffee, the Red Herring and Esquires Coffee. There is also a hotel on the site.

Industry

In recent times, Clonmel has become home to many large multi-national companies, particularly in the medical area. The two biggest medical companies in the town are Abbott and Boston Scientific, both of which manufacture implantable devices. Two other multi-national pharmaceutical companies are Merck & Co. and Pinewood Healthcare which can be found less than twenty minutes away.

The town produces many beverages both alcoholic and non-alcoholic. The original brewery in the town is set to become a new visitor attraction. Glenpatrick Spring Water bottles still, carbonated and flavoured water from the limestone rocks beneath Slievenamon for many big supermarket chains in Ireland and the UK such as Tesco and M&S.

Clonmel is home to international engineering and construction groups such as Kentz and Sepam which were both founded in the town. Sepam has helped in the construction of huge infrastructure projects around the world such as the Queen Elizabeth Olympic Park in London, Disneyland Shanghai and some of the terminals at Heathrow Airport to name a few.

Media

Radio
Tipp FM is a local radio station for the county of Tipperary. It has its main office in Clonmel. In 2019, Tippfm had over 69,000 listeners tuning in every week, increasing its market share to 35% . It broadcasts on FM, on 95.3, 97.1, 103.3 and 103.9. The Clonmel transmitter broadcasts on 97.1 MHz.

Print
Clonmel is home to three newspapers: two broadsheets and one tabloid free sheet.
The Nationalist, founded in 1890, is a Clonmel-based broadsheet newspaper that appears weekly, covering both Clonmel town and South Tipperary. It has a circulation of 14,375. It was formed to represent the views of the nationalist community in Tipperary, which led to the first editor being jailed under the Coercion Act on charges that he had intimidated a cattle dealer for taking a farm from which tenants had been evicted. It is now run by Johnston Press.

Also owned by Johnston Press is South Tipp Today, a free tabloid newspaper with a circulation of 20,500 founded in 1995. It is delivered door-to-door in some areas, and available in local shops across South Tipperary. It is popular, fondly referred to as the 'small paper' by its readers, and covers news, entertainment, local notes and lifestyle.

The Sporting Press is published and printed in Clonmel, it covers news related to the greyhound community in Ireland. It has a circulation of 7,500.

The short-lived Premier People was launched in Clonmel in October 2010. It was a weekly (tabloid) freesheet with a focus on news, local notes and sports and was published on Tuesday evenings. It was delivered door-to-door in Clonmel and to all shops in South Tipperary. It was founded by Ann Commins, who co-founded South Tipp Today. Premier People ceased publishing in 2011.

The Tipperary Free Press was established in 1826 by the future first catholic Lord Mayor of Clonmel, John Hackett, following a meeting of the Clonmel Corporation.  It was proposed that a Liberal and Independent newspaper should be in circulation in the district and Councillor Hackett, having been a printer and bookbinder in the town for some years, stepped forward to take on the task.   The successful newspaper with a circulation of 45,650 in 1829 was an influential and popular voice in supporting liberal causes, yet it was labelled as radical. Its primary intention was to be 'The voice of the common people''' and played a highly prominent role in the quest for Catholic Emancipation as advocated by Daniel O'Connell.  Hackett was sued for libel on multiple occasions for his caricatures of political rivals.  Printed on O'Connell Street bi-weekly, it circulated in counties Tipperary, Waterford, Kilkenny, Cork and Limerick.  In its later years, it assumed a Catholic-Whig political leaning.  Printing ceased when it was acquired by the Tipperary Independent (1882–1906) in 1883.

 Culture 

 Museums and Galleries 

The Tipperary Museum of Hidden History  tells the history of County Tipperary from the Stone Age to the present. It is also host to many special exhibitions each year. It is the first custom-built county museum in Ireland.

The Main Guard was a civic building until 1810 when it was converted to shops. During a recent restoration, some of its sandstone columns were found to have been 'reclaimed' from the Medieval ruins of the Cistercian Inislounaght Abbey at Marlfield. It has been used in the past as a Tholsel or office to collect tolls, duties and customs dues, a place for civic gatherings and as a court. It now houses an exhibition showing the historic development of Clonmel, including a model of the town as it appeared in the 13th century.

The South Tipperary Arts Centre opened in 1996. The Arts Centre hosts around 12 exhibitions per year and a variety of art classes for adults and children. As well as presenting a range of visual arts exhibitions in the main gallery space, the centre also host events such as music, performance, poetry readings and dance. The centre has a spacious upstairs studio which is used for short term exhibitions & screenings, as well as for a variety of classes and workshops. It is also a rehearsal space for theatre, dance, music, and is available for meetings and seminars.

 Theatre and cinema 
The White Memorial Theatre building is a former Wesleyan/Methodist Chapel and was designed and built by local architect William Tinsley in 1843. The building was purchased in 1975 by St. Mary's Choral Society  and named after Society founder Professor James A White, Frank Patterson's first music mentor. The society put on an average of 2 shows a year in the building. The building also hosts shows by the Stage Craft Youth Theatre group and special event during the year.

Clonmel has a vibrant youth arts sector. Stagecraft Youth Theatre was founded in 1998 by current Artistic Director Shane Dempsey. Stagecraft provides training for young actors in all aspects of theatre practice. Stagecraft is renowned for producing vibrant work in a fun, child-centred environment. Stagecraft is one of Ireland's largest youth theatre's and is affiliated with NAYD. They have recently staged works by Alex Jones, Enda Walsh, Hannah Burke, Jack Thorne and Moira Buffini.

In 2011 Shane Dempsey founded The Hub, a 45-seat studio theatre in Albert Street. The Hub is home to Stagecraft.

The IMC, with five screens and located on Kickham Street, is the town's only remaining cinema. Several other cinemas formerly operated in the town including the Ritz, which opened in 1940 and was located on the site of the present Credit Union. The first cinema in the town opened in January 1913 as the Clonmel Cinema Theatre, soon to be renamed the Clonmel Electric Picture Palace. It was located at the rear of No. 35 Gladstone Street. It was soon followed by John Magner's Theatre at the Mall, which burned to the ground in 1919, to be re-built in 1921 with an increased capacity of over a thousand seats. It was eventually named the Regal Theatre and remodelled as an 850-seat theatre, which finally closed in 2001. It was in the Regal Theatre where the tenor Frank Patterson made his stage debut. The Oisin, in O'Connell Street, was of a similar scale and was also built in 1921. It was on the site of the present-day Heatons but burned to the ground in 1965. The last film to be shown there was A Patch of Blue.

 Festivals 

For nine days from the first weekend of July, the town hosts the annual Clonmel Junction Festival. It consists of a mix of street theatre, rock, traditional and world music. Several international acts visit the festival each year. In the last few years, young local bands have also had an opportunity to showcase their talents. Children from local schools and community groups are encouraged to participate with support from local artists.

Finding a Voice is a festival that is held around International Women's Day, 8 March. It presents performances of music by female composers.

Clonmel is home to the International Film Festival Ireland, which focuses on independent films. Its inaugural event was during September 2009 and ran for five days. It has become an annual event, occurring every September. The 2010 event expanded to include a Youth Film Festival, that showcased locally made short films.

The Clonmel Busking festival runs for four days every August. It provides free music events during the day in Clonmel town centre, while at night a number of concerts take place in various venues throughout the town.

 Music 
Banna Chluain Meala (literally translating as 'Clonmel band') was founded in 1971. Originally a brass band, Banna Chluain Meala later developed as a brass and reed band, which included a concert, marching and field show performances.  The band also has a colour guard section which enhances marching and field show performances. The total complement of the band has ranged from 100 to 150 members throughout the years.  The band has travelled widely abroad to the United Kingdom, the Netherlands, France, Italy and Chicago in the United States of America and represented Ireland at an International Festival in Cheb in the Czech Republic in 2004 to celebrate the new entrants to the European Union.

Banna Chluain Meala is one of Ireland's most honoured bands. They hold concert band championship titles on national and international levels.  As a marching band, they have had unparalleled success nationally, being crowned IMBA Irish champions in the highest division on twelve occasions (1991, 1995, 1996, 1997, 1998, 1999, 2006, 2007, 2009, 2010, 2011, 2015).  They have also had success abroad, including as Open Class champions at the British Youth Band Championships at Wembley in 1994.

Clonmel has hosted the Irish traditional music festival, the Fleadh Cheoil, on five occasions from 1992 to 1994 inclusive, and again in 2003 and 2004.

One of the better-known songs concerning Clonmel is "The Gaol of Cluain Meala," a translation from the turn of the 19th century by a Cork man, Jeremiah Joseph Callanan, of the traditional Irish-language song "Príosún Chluain Meala". It was revived by the celebrated balladeer Luke Kelly in the 1960s. The narrator in the Irish republican song "Galtee Mountain Boy" farewells Clonmel in the song. The song was written by Patsy Halloran from Clonmel.

Music venues in Clonmel include The Piper Inn, famous for hosting a show by Irish rock band Thin Lizzy.

Clonmel in literatureVertue rewarded, or The Irish princess (1693), one of the earliest romance novels written in the English language, tells the story of "Merinda" from High Street, Clonmel and a Williamite officer stationed in the town during the Jacobite war.

Raymond Chandler's 1939 novel The Big Sleep features Rusty Regan as a main character: "A big curly-headed Irishman from Clonmel, with sad eyes and a smile as wide as Wilshire Boulevard."

Charles Kickham's 1873 novel Knocknagow had two main characters modelled on Clonmel locals.  These were his cousins, Dr T.J. Crean Sr. as "Arthur O'Conner" and his wife Clara Crean (née Kickham) as "Mary Kearney", who both lived on Queen Street at the time.

John Flanagan's 2009 novel The Kings of Clonmel uses Clonmel as a fictional kingdom.  It is the eighth book in the Ranger's Apprentice series.

 Sport 

 Association Football 
Clonmel is home to Clonmel Celtic, Old Bridge, Wilderness Rovers, Redmondstown and Clonmel Town who play in the TSDL League.

Athletics
Clonmel is home to Clonmel Athletic Club.

 Rugby 
Clonmel Rugby Club plays in the All Ireland League, Division 2C. The rugby club was founded in 1892. In 1990 the club opened their new club House coinciding with the first-ever Soviet Union rugby team visit to Ireland. In their centenary year, 1992, they hosted London Irish RFC against Shannon RFC in a memorable game played at the club grounds. Clonmel won the Munster Junior Cup for the first time in its 122-year history in 2014 and followed that up with a Munster Junior League (Division 1) title and the Munster Junior Challenge Cup in the 2015 season.

 Cricket 
Clonmel's cricket club plays teams in the Munster Cricket Union Senior 2 and Senior 3 leagues. The cricket club currently fields 1 adult teams and 2 youth teams. All play their home games in the Presentation Convent Field.

 Horse Racing and Coursing 
Clonmel is noted in greyhound circles for being the home of the annual National Hare Coursing meeting in early February at Clonmel Racecourse located in the Powerstown area of the town. Also Included in this event is the Ladies' International Open Meeting and the coursing derby. At this time each year, Clonmel's population is swollen by a large influx of sportspeople from Ireland, the UK, and from as far afield as Australia, New Zealand, the United States and the Middle East.

 Rowing and boat building 
Clonmel has two clubs associated with recreational activity on the river Suir, both of which are based in Irishtown.

Clonmel Rowing Club (CRC)
Clonmel Rowing Club (CRC), was founded in 1869 and is one of the oldest sporting clubs in the town. It is located on Moor's Island, on the Suir, about 500 meters west of the town centre. The club colours are Royal Blue and White. Sporting success in the early 1900s culminated in the winning of the Senior Men's 'eight' championships in 1920. The club is affectionately known locally as "The Island". In winter, training takes place on a 4-mile stretch of the river to the west of the town, from the clubhouse to Knocklofty bridge. In the summer months this stretch is reduced to 2 miles as far as Sandybanks, near Marlfield village.

Flooding has become a perennial problem, especially noticeable in recent years. The flow becomes so fast that rowing in January is not possible on this part of the Suir. Within a 25-mile radius there are two locations where the club can still train satisfactorily, Cappoquin and Fiddown.

CRC has a newly constructed, purpose-built boathouse since 1979, with boat storage on the ground floor. Upstairs are two squash courts, a function hall and dressing rooms. Currently, one squash court is being used as the gym.

Recently, Clonmel has seen a resurgence with the success of Daire Lynch winning the men's senior single sculls and making international representation.

 Workmen's Boat Club 
The Workmen's Boat Club was established in 1883. The property was leased from the Bagwell estate until 1999 when it was finally purchased by the club. One of the major undertakings of the club in recent years has been the restoration of the historic racing craft Cruiskeen, which was built in the 1840s by GAA founder member Maurice Davin. The project, outsourced to 'Conservation | Letterfrack', took several years of meticulous cleaning, treatment and repair and the 38 ft./11.6m timber boat is now on permanent display in the County Museum, Clonmel.

 GAA Clubs 
Clonmel is home to several Gaelic Athletic Association (GAA) clubs. Clonmel Óg the most recently established GAA club in the town was set up in 1984 and it competes in the senior division only 31 years after being formed. Moyle Rovers GAA club is just outside the town and has been a dominant force in recent decades.

Gaelic football club Clonmel Commercials, the 2016 Munster Football Club champions, are based in the town, on the Western Road. They reached the semi-finals of the 2015-16 All Ireland Football Club championships, losing out to Ballyboden St. Endas, who would go on to win the championship. Sister hurling club, St. Mary's, are also located on Western Road.

Education

Primary schools

 Gaelscoil Chluain Meala has around 200 students. Located at Irishtown and originally the Free School, the building was designed by two pupils of the renowned architect John Nash. It was for a number of years the offices of South Tipperary County Council.
 St Mary's Parochial School, Clonmel, also known as the Model School, traces its roots to the Incorporated Society School of 1832. It is located on the Western Road. (Church of Ireland)
St Oliver's national school was founded in 1982. It is situated at Heywood Road.
 St.Mary's CBS is located in Irishtown directly beside the Gaelscoil.
 St.Peter and Paul's CBS.
 Sisters of Charity Girls School.
 Presentation Primary School.

Secondary schools
 Presentation Convent, for girls, (Roman Catholic)
 Loreto Convent, for girls, (Roman Catholic)
 CBS High School, for boys, (Roman Catholic)
 Gaelcholáiste Chéitinn, co-educational. Part of the Clonmel Central Technical Institute. Established in 2004, the school teaches through the medium of Irish. It was established as an autonomous school within the Vocational Education Committee system in response to a demand for second-level education through the medium of Irish.
 Coláiste Chluain Meala, co-educational. Formerly known as The Clonmel Central Technical Institute Secondary School which traces its history back to 1842. Under the control of the local Education and Training Board.
 CTI Senior College, co-educational. Part of the Clonmel Central Technical Institute and under the control of the local Education and Training Board. There is an official website listing PLC courses.

Third level

Clonmel is home to one third-level college, LIT. It will merge with Athlone IT to become an as-yet-untitled technological university (TU), in 2021/22. The Clonmel Campus of LIT offers courses in Business, Creative Multimedia, Digital Animation Production and Marketing with Languages. The Creative Multimedia & Digital Animation Production degrees are operated under the LIT Limerick School of Art and Design. The LIT Clonmel campus is located along the Clonmel Inner Relief Road, but it is proposed that it will move to a new location within the town centre in the future.

Training
Clonmel Youth Training Entreprises Limited was established in 1984 by voluntary and business people, who saw the need to tackle the growing issue of unemployment and the related consequences of early school leavers in Clonmel.

Transport

Roads
Clonmel is located on the N24, the national primary roadway that links the cities of Limerick and Waterford. The N24 westbound connects Clonmel to junction 10 of the Cork to Dublin M8 motorway, while eastbound it links the town with Kilkenny via the N76.

Charles Bianconi, onetime mayor of the town, ran his pioneering public transport system of horse-drawn carriages from Clonmel.

Rail
Clonmel railway station opened on 1 May 1852. Today there are two trains daily to Waterford via Carrick on Suir, and two to Limerick Junction via Cahir and Tipperary which has main-line connections to Dublin. There is no Sunday service.

Waterways
The River Suir had been made navigable to Clonmel from 1760 when completion of the River Suir Navigation in the 19th century allowed large vessels to reach the town's quays.

People associated with Clonmel
 Anne Anderson (born 1952), was Ireland's first female Ambassador to the United States of America, United Nations, France, Monaco and European Union, born in Clonmel.
 Bonaventura Baron (1610–1696), a distinguished Franciscan humanist, philosopher and writer was born in Clonmel.
 Charles Bianconi (1786–1875), one-time mayor of Clonmel, ran his pioneering public transport system of horse-drawn carriages from Clonmel
 George Borrow (1803–1881), polyglot, ethnologist of the Romani people and author of Lavengro, in which he briefly writes of his time in Clonmel, lived here in 1815
 Francis Bryan (1490–1550), English courtier and diplomat during the reign of Henry VIII, died in Clonmel in 1550
 Austin Carroll (1835–1909), Irish Catholic nun and writer
 Thomas Chamney, Irish athlete who ran 800m in Beijing Olympics in 2008
 Bridget Cleary (1869-1895), burned alive by her husband, Michael Cleary, because she was believed to be a shapeshifting fairy. The ensuing criminal trial was very high-profile.
 William J. Duane (1780–1865), American politician and lawyer from Pennsylvania, was born in Clonmel.
 Dave Foley is a professional rugby union player
 Sarah Pim Grubb (1746–1832), Quaker businesswoman, wife of John Grubb, died in Clonmel
 Vincent Hanley (1954–1987), a pioneering Irish radio DJ and television presenter, nicknamed "Fab Vinny". He worked mainly for Raidió Teilifís Éireann and was the first Irish celebrity to die from an AIDS-related illness
Mary Elizabeth Southwell Dudley Leathley (1818– 1899), writer, was born in Clonmel in 1818.
 Sir Lionel Milman, 7th Baronet (1877–1962), Anglo-Irish first-class cricketer and British Army officer
 Fred Murray, former professional football player, now personal masseur for Foo Fighters member Dave Grohl
 Vivian Murray, businessman
 Pat O'Callaghan was an Irish athlete and 1928 Olympic gold medalist
 Nellie Ó Cléirigh was an Irish lace authority and historian
 Mícheál Ó Súilleabháin (1950–2018), an Irish musician, held Professorship of Music at the Irish World Music Centre of the University of Limerick
 Frank Patterson (1938–2000), one of Ireland's most famous tenors, was native to the town
 Ramsay Weston Phipps (1838–1923), military historian, born in Clonmel, lived there off and on throughout his life
 Rozanna Purcell, model and Miss Universe Ireland 2010
 Adi Roche, co-founder of Chernobyl Children's Project International and 1997 candidate for the Irish Presidency
 Andrea Roche, best known Irish model and Miss Ireland 1997
 Symon Semeonis, or Simon Fitzsimons, was a 14th-century Franciscan friar who left Clonmel in 1323 on pilgrimage to the Holy Land. The account of his "Itinerary" is preserved in a manuscript in the Library of Corpus Christi College, Cambridge
 Laurence Sterne (1713–68), author of The Life and Opinions of Tristram Shandy, Gentleman, was born in the town, though his family returned to England soon after
 Anthony Trollope (1815–1852), a noted author, worked in the town for a period
 Stephen White (1575–1646) was an Irish Jesuit, historian and antiquarian born in Clonmel, who wrote about the early Irish saints

Sister towns
Clonmel is twinned with several places:

See also
 Clonmel Borstal
 Grange, County Tipperary
 List of towns and villages in Ireland
 Market Houses in Ireland
 Siege of Clonmel
 St Joseph's Industrial School, Clonmel
St. Patrick's Well, Clonmel

References

 History of Clonmel William P. Burke 1907 from Internet Archive.
  Observations on fishing and other 'native fauna', Clonmel, 1833
 From Cahir to Clonmel, 1834
 White, James : My Clonmel Scrapbook : 1995 based on 1907 original 
 The Cistercian Abbeys of Tipperary (inc. Inislaunaght founded 1147–8) from Four Courts Press 
 Watson, Sydney John : A Dinner of Herbs: A History of Old Saint Mary's Church, Clonmel 1988 
 McGrath, Bríd (ed.): The Minute Book of the Corporation of Clonmel, 1608–1649'' : Irish Manuscripts Commission  : 2006 :

External links

 
County towns in the Republic of Ireland
Towns and villages in County Tipperary
Boroughs in the Republic of Ireland
Iffa and Offa East